Harrison Queen House is a historic home located near Caledonia, Missouri. It features an exterior limestone chimney.

It was listed on the National Register of Historic Places in 2002.

References

Log houses in the United States
Houses on the National Register of Historic Places in Missouri
Houses completed in 1875
Buildings and structures in Washington County, Missouri
National Register of Historic Places in Washington County, Missouri